Statistics of Swedish football Division 3 for the 2005 season.

League standings

Norra Norrland 2005

Mellersta Norrland 2005

Södra Norrland 2005

Norra Svealand 2005

Östra Svealand 2005

Västra Svealand 2005

Nordöstra Götaland 2005

Nordvästra Götaland 2005

Mellersta Götaland 2005

Sydöstra Götaland 2005

Sydvästra Götaland 2005

Södra Götaland 2005

Footnotes

References 

Swedish Football Division 3 seasons
4
Sweden
Sweden